Marco Rigamonti, is an Italian writer, essayist, novelist and esotericist, born in Treviso, Italy on December 27, 1977. 

He is the current Grand Master of the controversial organization known as the Priory of Sion since 2016. Given leadership by Gino Sandri, the protégé of Pierre Plantard, Rigamonti is the leader of the latest incarnation of the known hoax created by Plantard in the 1950s.
He is also known to be a member of a Knights Templar group known as OSMTH/SMOTJ.

Publications 
Il Priorato di Sion - Dalla tradizione all'et à moderna - 
La Doctrine du Prieuré de Sion - 
Rituals and regulations of the Priory of Sion - 
Les dossiers secrets du  Prieuré De Sion  - Henri Lobineau - Introduction de Marco Rigamonti - Grand Maître du Prieuré de Sion - Ordre de la Rose-Croix Véritas O.D.L.R.C.V. (Francese) - Copertina flessibile – 12 March 2020
Il Priorato di Sion presenta: ai piedi del monte, difendendo la rosa: Parabole tra la rosa e la croce (introduzione)
Arca di Sion - di Francesca Valentina Salcioli - Con intervista al Gran Maestro del Priorato di Sion

Links 
Prieuré de Sion - Ordre de la Rose-Crooix Véritas O.D.L.R.C.V.

Notes 
Par ce geste le Prieuré de Sion embrasse Rennes le Château - La Depeche.Fr
Le Prieuré de Sion aujourd'hui - by Johan Netchacovitch
Intervista al Gran Maestro del Priorato di Sion - a cura di Simone Leoni*

1977 births
Living people
Esotericists
Italian essayists
Italian novelists
Italian fraudsters